VA-14 has the following meanings:
Attack Squadron 14 (U.S. Navy)

State Route 14 (Virginia)